Julien Denormandie (born 14 August 1980) is a French engineer and politician of La République En Marche! (LREM) who served as Minister of Agriculture in the government of Prime Minister Jean Castex from 2019 to 2022.

Denormandie was named Minister (in France named Secretary of state)  of Territorial Cohesion on 21 June 2017, and then Minister for Towns and Housing in October 2018.

Early life and education
After being admitted in 2000 to Agro ParisTech, Denormandie passed the entry exam into the Rural, Water and Forest Engineer's Corps in 2002. After studying as an apprentice in the 2002-2004 group, he took the ENGREF course in the first year and an MBA at the Collège des Ingénieurs in the second year.

Early career 
After being named a Countryside, Water and Forests engineer on October 1, 2004, Denormandie was assigned to a position at the Ministry of the Economy and Finances. In 2011, he was chief of the foreign offices of Turkey, the Balkans, the CEI and the Middle East concerning bilateral economic relationships and the Treasury Office.

He rejoined the ministerial cabinets, before becoming Counsel to the Minister of Foreign Commerce Nicole Bricq and Minister of Finances Pierre Moscovici in July 2012, a position where he was noticed by the Cabinet Director Rémy Rioux, then by Emmanuel Macron, the then-secretary general at the Élysée (French Presidential Office).

In the summer of 2014, he created a start-up with Ismael Emelien. The aim of the project 'was to see how technology (through educational applications) could benefit early years learning,' until Emmanuel Macron (who had been Economics Minister for a number of years) got them on his side. He became the joint cabinet director in September 2014.

Political career 
Denormandie left his government post in March 2016 to participate in the creation of La République En Marche! of which he became the joint secretary. In this capacity, he was part of Macron’s campaign staff.
 
Following the 2017 elections, Denormandie was a Minister of the City and Housing (2018-2020) and State Secretary to successive Ministers of Territorial Cohesion Jacques Mézard and Jacqueline Gourault (2017-2018) in the government of Prime Ministers Édouard Philippe. During that time, he notably announced in 2017 cuts to a housing allowance scheme enjoyed by 10 percent of the population and promised to free up social housing for the most needy as it seeks to rein in public spending.

In 2020, Denormandie oversaw work on a draft law reversing a ban on a class of pesticides and allowing sugar beet growers to use neonicotinoids, in a move portrayed as essential to save the country’s sugar industry.

References

1980 births
Living people
La République En Marche! politicians
People from Cahors
French engineers
Politicians from Occitania (administrative region)
French Ministers of Agriculture
French Ministers of Food